The Daily Sun is the largest daily newspaper in South Africa. Daily Sun may also refer to the following newspapers:

United States
 Arizona Daily Sun, Flagstaff, Arizona
 Bowdoin Daily Sun, Connecticut, published by Bowdoin College
 Daily Sun (Warner Robins, Georgia), published from 1969 to 2003
 Waukegan Daily Sun, Illinois, published from 1897 to 1930, an ancestor of the Lake County News-Sun
 The Lewiston Daily Sun, Lewiston, Maine, published from 1896 to 1989, at which time it merged with The Daily Journal to create the Sun Journal
 The Portland Daily Sun, Portland, Maine, published from 2009 to 2014
 Hudson Daily Sun, Hudson, Massachusetts, founded in 1902, an ancestor of the Enterprise-Sun
 The Berlin Daily Sun, Berlin, New Hampshire, a free newspaper published three days a week
 The Conway Daily Sun, Conway, New Hampshire, a free newspaper
 The Laconia Daily Sun, Laconia, New Hampshire, a free newspaper
 The Cornell Daily Sun, Ithaca, New York, a Cornell University student publication
 Puerto Rico Daily Sun, San Juan, Puerto Rico, the island's only daily English-language newspaper
 Corsicana Daily Sun, Corsicana, Texas

Others
 Daily Sun (Bangladesh), Dhaka
 The Sun (Nigeria), daily newspaper printed in Lagos, Nigeria
 The Sun (Brisbane), formerly The Daily Sun, discontinued newspaper of News Limited, Australia

See also
 Daily Sun News, Sunnyside and Yakima, Washington
 The Sunday Sun (disambiguation)
 Sun (newspaper)